Natatolana honu is a species of crustacean in the family Cirolanidae, and was first described by Stephen John Keable in 2006. The species epithet, honu, comes from a Maori word meaning "deep".

It is a benthic species, living at depths of 1120 - 1313 m in temperate waters, off the west coasts of the North and South Islands of New Zealand.

References

External links
Natatolana honu occurrence data from GBIF

Cymothoida
Crustaceans of New Zealand
Crustaceans described in 2006
Taxa named by Stephen John Keable